"This Is Amazing Grace" is the lead single on Phil Wickham's fifth studio album The Ascension. It was released on August 6, 2013 by Fair Trade Services, and it was written by Wickham, Josh Farro and Jeremy Riddle, and produced by Pete Kipley. Billboard named it No. 1 on the Christian Airplay Songs chart for 2014. This song was released originally by Jeremy Riddle on the album For the Sake of the World with Bethel Music.

Charts

Weekly charts

Year-end charts

Decade-end charts

Certifications

References 
 

2013 singles
Contemporary Christian songs
2013 songs
Songs written by Jeremy Riddle
Songs written by Josh Farro
Songs written by Phil Wickham
Phil Wickham songs